The 2016 United States presidential election in Washington took place on November 8, 2016 as part of the 2016 United States presidential election. Washington was won by Hillary Clinton, who won the state with 52.54% of the vote over Donald Trump's 36.83%, a margin of 15.71%. All of the state's 12 electoral votes were assigned to Clinton, though four defected. Trump prevailed in the presidential election nationally.

In the presidential primaries, Washington voters chose Republican Party's nominee; the Democratic Party used the caucus system, and Green Party nominee was chosen in a convention. Hillary Clinton won the election in Washington with 52.5 percent of the vote, a reduced percentage from President Obama in 2012, though due to Trump receiving an even greater drop in percentage compared with Mitt Romney, Washington was among 11 states where Clinton improved on Obama's margin of victory. This was the first presidential election in which the Republican Party won Grays Harbor and Pacific Counties since 1928 and 1952 respectively. It was also the first time the GOP had won Cowlitz County since Ronald Reagan in 1980, and the first Republican win in Mason County since Reagan in 1984. On the other hand, Trump became the first Republican to win the White House without carrying Whitman County since William McKinley in 1900.

Despite Clinton's victory, four Democratic electors defected. Three voted for Colin Powell, making him the first African-American Republican to receive electoral votes, while a Native American activist cast his vote for Faith Spotted Eagle, making her the first Native American to receive an electoral vote for president. Powell became the first Republican to receive electoral votes from Washington state since Ronald Reagan in 1984. However, overall it was the eighth consecutive election in which Washington voted Democratic, and the twelfth in a row in which it voted the same way as neighboring Oregon.

Primaries and Caucuses

Washington has voted for the Democratic candidate in every presidential election since 1988. While the state's Senate was majority Republican in 2016, both of Washington's United States Senators are Democrats, as well as a majority of the state's U.S. House delegation. Barack Obama defeated John McCain by 17.08% in 2008 and Mitt Romney by 14.87% in 2012.

Primary elections

Democratic caucus

 Bernie Sanders bested Hillary Clinton in the Democratic presidential caucus on March 26, 2016:

The state also held a non-binding presidential primary on May 24, the same date as the state's Republican primary. Hillary Clinton won the preference vote.

Republican primary

Four candidates appeared on the Republican presidential primary ballot on May 24, 2016:

 Ben Carson (withdrawn)
 Ted Cruz (withdrawn)
 John Kasich (withdrawn)
 Donald Trump

Green convention
This state's Green Party state convention was on May 15. Ballots were emailed to members within a week after the convention.

General election

Predictions

Polling

Democrat Hillary Clinton won every pre-election poll and all but one by double digits. The average of the final three polls showed Hillary Clinton leading Donald Trump 50.3% to 36%.

State voting history
Washington joined the Union in November 1889 and has participated in all elections from 1892 onwards.

Since 1900, Washington voted Democratic 51.72 percent of the time and Republican 44.83 percent of the time. Since 1988, Washington had voted for the Democratic Party in each presidential election, and the same was expected to happen in 2016.

Results

By county

Counties that flipped from Democratic to Republican

 Clallam (largest city: Port Angeles)
 Cowlitz (largest city: Longview)
 Grays Harbor (largest city: Aberdeen)
 Mason (largest city: Shelton)
 Pacific (largest city: Raymond)

Counties that flipped from Republican to Democratic

 Whitman (largest city: Pullman)

By congressional district
Clinton won 7 of 10 congressional districts including one represented by a Republican.

See also
 United States presidential elections in Washington (state)
 Presidency of Donald Trump
 2016 Democratic Party presidential debates and forums
 2016 Democratic Party presidential primaries
 2016 Republican Party presidential debates and forums
 2016 Republican Party presidential primaries

Notes

References

External links
 RNC 2016 Republican Nominating Process 
 Green papers for 2016 primaries, caucuses, and conventions

WA
2016
Presidential